Insulin-dependent (type I)diabetes mellitus  (IDDM) is a genetic heterogenouse autoimmune disorder, which is triggered by genetic predisposition and environmental factors. The prevalence of insulin-dependent (type I) diabetes mellitus (IDDM) among children and young adult from Europe is approximately 0.4%. Insulin-dependent (type I) diabetes mellitus (IDDM) is characterized by acute onset and insulin deficiency. Patients with  insulin-dependent (type I) diabetes mellitus (IDDM) are found with gradual loss of the pancreatic islet beta cells and therefore not able to produce insulin. As a result, they usually need exogenous insulin to maintain their life.

Gene location of IDDM 
Genome-wide linkage analysis could be used for identification in susceptibility genes of insulin-dependent (type I) diabetes mellitus (IDDM). This analysis verifies that eighteen different genome regions are predisposed to insulin-dependent (type I) diabetes mellitus(IDDM). There are 18 different symbols of genome region, which is labeled from IDDM1 to IDDM18. The MHC HLA gene (IDDM1) and the insulin gene INS (IDDM2) are the major genetic candidates in the development of insulin-dependent (type I) diabetes mellitus(IDDM), which are located on the chromosome 6p21.3 and chromosome 11p15 respectively. IDDM3, IDDM4, IDDM5 IDDM7 reside in  chromosome 15q26, chromosome 11q13, chromosome 6q25 and 2q31 respectively.IDDM11 (insulin-dependent diabetes mellitus 11) is one of the susceptibility genes for IDDM which locates on chromosome 14q24.3-q31. This loci is identified by linkage to D14S67 marker via a sibling-pair linkage analysis Based on the previous study, the biological behavior of IDDM11is different to HLA region genes so that IDDM11 is less predisposing to HLA. Moreover, IDDM11 has more involvement on the families that are less predisposing to HLA, while IDDM11 has less involvement on the families that are more predisposing to HLA. The rest of susceptibility genes locus in insulin-dependent (type I) diabetes mellitus (IDDM)are shown in table 1.
 Table 1 The locus for susceptibility genes for IDDM.

Gene characteristics of IDDM 
Most regions of IDDM loci are 1 to 40 cM, which are corresponded to 1 to 40Mb. Each region of IDDM consists several genes.

Mutations 
The etiological mutations of all IDDM loci have not been found.

Controversies

SEL1L gene (sel-1 suppressor of Lin-12-like Caenorhabdits elegans) is a negative regulator of the  Notch signaling pathway that is responsible for  pancreatic endocrine cell development. SEL1L gene is located on chromosome 14q24.3-31. The locus of  SEL1L is near to D14S67 marker used for identification of IDDM 11 so that SEL1L gene can serve as a candidate gene for IDDM11. However, the present researchers are object to this thesis. The present researchers use LD (Linkage disequilibrium) analyses and TDT (transmission disequilibrium test) to analyze the SEL1L gene among Danish and Sardinian families. The research result indicates that the SEL1L gene is not supposed to a candidate gene for IDDM11. In addition, other candidate genes for IDDM11 could be tested and identified by using single nucleotide polymorphism (SNP) technology. The following table shows some candidate genes for IDDM11.
 Table 2 Candidate genes for IDDM11.

References

Genes
Human proteins